Bomber Mountain is the crest of a ridge line within the Bighorn Mountains of the U.S. State of Wyoming. It borders the south side of Cloud Peak, the tallest peak in the range. A military aviation accident that occurred upon the mountain in 1943 led to it being named Bomber Mountain in 1946. For more info see, "The Bomber Mountain Crash: A Wyoming Mystery" by Scott Madsen, Published and Copyrighted in September, 1990

1943 air accident 
On 28 June 1943, a B-17F-55-DL Flying Fortress, serial number 42-3399, nicknamed "Scharazad", departed Pendleton Army Air Base in Pendleton, Oregon destined for Grand Island, Nebraska. From there, the bomber would join the other members of the 383d Bomb Group and continue to England to participate in the ongoing World War II bombing campaigns.  Around midnight, the captain radioed that their position was near Powder River, Wyoming.  They were not heard from again.  After they failed to arrive in Grand Island, the plane was declared missing and the Army mounted a search effort with no results.  A second search was conducted the following year, concentrating on the Wind River Mountains, Absaroka Mountains and Bighorn Mountains, but still no wreckage was spotted.

On 12 August 1945, two cowboys spotted something shiny on a ridge line in the Cloud Peak area of the Big Horn Mountains.  They discovered the wreckage and the deceased crew, and contacted authorities, who conducted an operation to recover the bodies of the crew and return them to their families.  It was believed that during earlier search efforts, the paint color of the aircraft blended in closely with the mountain side, making the wreckage difficult to spot.  After a few years, the paint wore off, and the shiny aluminum underneath made the plane more visible.  No official cause for the crash was ever determined, but it is presumed that malfunctioning navigational equipment, and a moonless night combined with bad weather caused the pilot to not see the ridge until it was too late.

After a petition by veterans groups in Wyoming, the previously unnamed ridge was christened Bomber Mountain on 22 August 1946 by the U.S. Forest Service. In honor of the crew members, a commemorative plaque was placed on the shores of Florence Lake,  from the crash site.

The crew included:

 William R. Ronaghan (pilot)
 Anthony J. Tilotta (co-pilot)
 Leonard H. Phillips (navigator)
 Charles H. Suppes (bombardier)
 James A. Hinds (aircraft engineer)
 Ferguson T. Bell, Jr. (radio operator)
 Lee 'Vaughn' Miller (assistant aircraft engineer)
 Charles E. Newburn, Jr (assistant radio operator)
 Jake F. Penick (aircraft gunner)
 Lewis M. Shepard (assistant aircraft gunner)

References 

Above info taken from "The Bomber Mountain Crash: A Wyoming Mystery" by Scott Madsen, Published in September, 1990

External links
 
 

Mountains of Big Horn County, Wyoming
Mountains of Johnson County, Wyoming
Mountains of Wyoming
History of Wyoming
Aviation accidents and incidents in the United States in 1943
1943 in Wyoming
Accidents and incidents involving military aircraft
Aviation accidents and incidents in Wyoming